The 1977 Canadian Open was the fourth edition of the professional invitational snooker tournament, the Canadian Open, which took place between 17 August and 5 September 1977.

Alex Higgins won the title defeating John Spencer 17–14 in the final.

Main draw

References

1977 in snooker
Open
Open
Open